Antoni Gościński OBE (born 4 January 1909 Poznań; died 12 December 1986 Belize) was a Polish medic. During the World War II he was arrested by the Germans in the course of the AB Action and imprisoned in Dachau concentration camp and later in Gusen I concentration camp (Mauthausen). There he became one of the leading doctors in the revier and a member of the inmates' underground trying to help the sick and wounded prisoners. He also documented German war crimes committed in the camp.

References 

1909 births
1986 deaths
Officers of the Order of the British Empire
Physicians from Poznań
Dachau concentration camp survivors
20th-century Polish physicians